Kirner Land is a Verbandsgemeinde ("collective municipality") in the district of Bad Kreuznach, Rhineland-Palatinate, Germany. The seat of the Verbandsgemeinde is in Kirn. It was formed on 1 January 2020 by the merger of the former Verbandsgemeinde Kirn-Land and the town Kirn.

The Verbandsgemeinde Kirner Land consists of the following Ortsgemeinden ("local municipalities"):

 Bärenbach
 Becherbach bei Kirn
 Brauweiler
 Bruschied
 Hahnenbach
 Heimweiler
 Heinzenberg
 Hennweiler
 Hochstetten-Dhaun
 Horbach
 Kellenbach
 Kirn
 Königsau
 Limbach
 Meckenbach
 Oberhausen bei Kirn
 Otzweiler
 Schneppenbach
 Schwarzerden
 Simmertal
 Weitersborn

External links
Official website

Verbandsgemeinde in Rhineland-Palatinate